T.N.B. College, Bhagalpur, also known as Tej Narayan Banaili College, established in 1883, is one of the oldest general degree colleges in Bhagalpur, Bihar. It  is affiliated to Tilka Manjhi Bhagalpur University, and offers undergraduate and postgraduate courses in the science and arts.

The college is spread across a campus of around 60 acres and houses its own stadium.

History
T.N.B. College is the second oldest college of higher learning in Bihar after Patna College. It was established on 12 Feb. 1883 with Intermediate level classes then called as F. A. under Calcutta University.  Just after two years of the establishment of college, undergraduate and Post-graduate classes in some of the subject of Arts and degree class in Law were started in this college. In the year 1959 it was made an affiliated college of Bihar University and later it became an affiliated college of Tilka Manjhi Bhagalpur University.

Departments

Science

Chemistry
Physics
Mathematics
Zoology
Botany
Biotechnology (Vocational)
Computer Applications (Vocational)

Arts and Law

English
Hindi
Urdu
Sanskrit
Geography
Economics
Political Science
Sociology
Philosophy
Maithili
History
Law

References

External links
 

Colleges affiliated to Tilka Manjhi Bhagalpur University
Education in Bhagalpur district
Educational institutions established in 1883
Universities and colleges in Bihar
1883 establishments in India